Anonymous is the sixth studio album by the American hardcore punk band Stray from the Path. The album was released on September 17, 2013, by Sumerian Records. The album was announced on July 17, 2013, after the website whereisourliberty.com was revealed to be a promotion tool for the album. A new song, "Badge & a Bullet," was released along with the announcement of the album.

The album debuted at #40 on the Billboard 200 album chart.

Critical reception
AllMusic wrote that the album "blends the political ferocity of Rage Against the Machine with the feral, punk-metal intensity of Agnostic Front." Exclaim! wrote that "most of the album's triumphs come when Stray From the Path keep the energy high, as on previous outings."

Track listing

Personnel 
Stray from the Path
 Andrew "Drew York" Dijorio – vocals
 Thomas Williams – guitar
 Anthony "Dragon Neck" Altamura – bass guitar, backing vocals
 Dan Bourke – drums

Guest musicians
 Jesse Barnett – vocals (track 3)
 Jason Aalon Butler – vocals (track 4)

Production
 Will Putney – production, engineering, mixing, mastering 
 Dan McBride – concept and artwork (alongside Stray from the Path), photo
 Taylor Aubin – photo
 Kiowa Gordon – model

References

2013 albums
Stray from the Path albums
Sumerian Records albums
Albums produced by Will Putney